Mary Jane "M.J." Tumbridge (born 12 July 1964) is a Bermudian equestrian. She competed at the 1992 Summer Olympics and the 2000 Summer Olympics. She was the first sportsperson from Bermuda to win a gold medal at the Pan Am Games, and is considered to be the best equestrian from the country.

Biography
Tumbridge was born in 1964 in Bermuda and began horse riding at the age of seven. At the age of eighteen, Tumbridge moved to the United States to compete in competitions, before moving to England in 1992. At the 1991 Pan American Games, Tumbridge won a silver medal, and six years later, at the 1999 Pan American Games, she won gold. Also in 1999, she was named as Bermuda's Female Athlete of the Year.

At the Olympic Games, Tumbridge competed in the individual eventing at the 1992 Summer Olympics, and the same discipline at the 2000 Summer Olympics. She was also the flag bearers for Bermuda at the 2000 Olympics.

At the 2000 Summer Olympics, Tumbridge rode the horse "Bermuda's Gold", the same horse she had won her gold medal at the Pan American Games a year earlier. However, during the Olympics, the horse broke her left hind leg, and was euthanised. This was the first time since the 1968 Summer Olympics that a horse had to be put down at the Olympics.

Following the Olympics, Tumbridge became a horse riding coach in England.

References

External links
 
 
 

1964 births
Living people
Bermudian female equestrians
Olympic equestrians of Bermuda
Equestrians at the 1992 Summer Olympics
Equestrians at the 2000 Summer Olympics
Pan American Games medalists in equestrian
Pan American Games gold medalists for Bermuda
Pan American Games silver medalists for Bermuda
Pan American Games bronze medalists for Bermuda
Equestrians at the 1991 Pan American Games
Equestrians at the 1999 Pan American Games
Place of birth missing (living people)
Medalists at the 1991 Pan American Games
Medalists at the 1999 Pan American Games